Adam Blackstone (born December 4, 1982, in Trenton, NJ) is a multi-instrumentalist, songwriter, producer, and bassist.  He is the musical director for Nicki Minaj and Justin Timberlake. Blackstone has also directed and played in performances with Jay-Z, Kanye West, Eminem, Janet Jackson, Dr. Dre, The Jonas Brothers, The Roots, Ms.Marilyn Marshall, Al Green, The Isley Brothers, Angie Stone, Mike Posner, Steve Tirpak, Al Jarreau, Maroon 5, Demi Lovato, and Jill Scott.

Early years
Adam began his musical journey playing drums at the age of 4 at El Bethel church on Euclid Avenue in Trenton, NJ. With his father serving as the church organist, and his mother singing in the choir, Adam Blackstone has said he first fell in love with music at church. Though Adam  had his sights set on being a drummer, Adam began playing bass in the 3rd grade after his music teacher suggested Adam  try it out. Adam then started playing upright bass in the 9th grade, in order to join his Willingboro high school jazz band. Adam Blackstone later on earned a full scholarship to the University of the Arts in Philadelphia thanks to his musical abilities. It was there that Adam studied contemporary Jazz and really honed in and perfected his bass playing and arranging skills.

Career
Adam Blackstone began his career as a session musician in the Philadelphia area. After becoming widely known in the area for his round, distinct tone, Adam caught the attention of drummer and producer Questlove of the well known Hip hop / Soul group, The Roots. His first big live show was at age 21 with Jay Z on his Fade to Black show at Madison Square Garden in November 2003. This show, along with Dave Chappelle's Block Party, were both filmed and made into popular documentaries that sold extremely well, and helped put Blackstone on the map. As Adam progressed, Adam became more well known among artists and labels for his tenacity, leadership skills, and hard work. Adam has since worked with and for several other A-list artists, providing all Adam can to not only meet, but exceed his clients standards.

In 2012, Adam was the music director and bassist for pop superstar Rihanna on her 777 Tour, which involved playing in 7 countries in 7 consecutive days.

Following his work with the popular American rock band Maroon 5, Adam Blackstone was also featured as an adviser to coach Adam Levine during NBC's season one of The Voice.

In 2014, Adam Blackstone was recruited by Eminem for his comeback show after a 3-year hiatus at the famed Austin City Limits Music Festival. More recently Adam works with Justin Timberlake as a member and music coordinator of his band formerly known as the Tennessee Kids.

Alongside working with several A-list artists at one time, Adam also runs his own production company with his wife Kaisha, entitled BBE (BASSic Black Entertainment), which features several up and coming pop and R&B acts. Founded in 2008, it thrives mostly as a live music staffing service for these artists. Kaisha Blackstone is the current CFO, while Adam runs the more creative side of the organization.

References

External links
 Official website
 BASSic Black Entertainment website

Living people
1982 births
21st-century American bass guitarists
Musicians from Trenton, New Jersey
Primetime Emmy Award winners